The Northern Sun women's basketball tournament is the annual conference women's basketball championship tournament for the Northern Sun Intercollegiate Conference. The tournament has been held annually since 2000. It is a single-elimination tournament and seeding is based on regular season records.

The winner receives the conference's automatic bid to the NCAA Women's Division II Basketball Championship.

Results

Championship appearances by school

 Bemidji State, Mary (ND), and Minot State have yet to reach the NSIC tournament final.
 Minnesota–Morris and Upper Iowa never reached the finals of the NSIC tournament before departing the conference.

See also
 Northern Sun men's basketball tournament

References

NCAA Division II women's basketball conference tournaments
Tournament
Recurring sporting events established in 2000